The Swaminathan family is an Indian family, prominent in public affairs. Its members include:

Subbarama Swaminathan, advocate
Ammu Swaminathan (his wife), social activist and politician
Lakshmi Sehgal (his daughter), freedom fighter and presidential candidate
Prem Sehgal (his son-in-law), soldier and officer Indian National Army
Suhasini Ali, (his granddaughter), communist politician
Shaad Ali, (his great grandson), Bollywood filmmaker
Mrinalini Sarabhai (his daughter), danseuse
Vikram Sarabhai (his son-in-law), scientist
Mallika Sarabhai, (his granddaughter), danseuse and activist
Govind Swaminadhan

See also
Sarabhai family

Indian families
Hindu families